Ralph Cyril Fulford Nichols (12 August 1910 – 27 May 2001) was an English male international badminton player.

Badminton career
Nichols won 9 All England Open Badminton Championships titles between 1932 and 1939, 5 of them in men's singles, 3 in men's doubles with his older brother Leslie Nichols and 1 in mixed doubles, and is the last Englishman to win the All England Open in men's singles (1938).
He also won four Irish Championships.

He was part of the English touring team that visited Canada during 1930. A match was held at the Granite Club in Toronto which England won 7–2.

Nichols was included in the Badminton Hall of Fame in 1997.

Major achievements

References

BadmintonOnline.com: Ralph Nichols (英国) 

1910 births
2001 deaths
English male badminton players